The Governor of Koshi Province is the nominal head of state of the Koshi Province of Nepal and a representative of the President of Nepal. The governor is appointed by the President for a term of five years. The governor's powers are mostly ceremonial and the executive powers of the governor are exercised by the chief minister of Koshi Province, who is the head of the executive of the state government of Koshi Province.

The incumbent, Parshuram Khapung, is serving as the governor of Koshi Province since 11 November 2021.

List of Governors

Selection process 
Article 164 of the Constitution of Nepal states that:
 being qualified for being a member of the Federal Parliament,
 having completed the age of thirty five years, and
 not being disqualified by any law.

References

 Koshi Province